Liepāja Holy Trinity Lutheran Cathedral is a historical Lutheran cathedral in Liepāja, Latvia. It is the seat of the Bishop of Liepāja, and principal church of the Diocese of Liepāja.

History
The foundation stone of the church was laid in 1742 and on December 5, 1758, the church was solemnly consecrated. The church interior and exterior architecture is built in the late baroque style with classic features. The cathedral interior is characterized by its Rococo features and luxurious furnishings with wood carvings and gold plating. The altar is 13 metres high and the cathedral is particularly notable for its organ with 131 stops, 4 manuals and over 7000 pipes, making it the largest mechanical organ in the world until 1968. It was the first large mechanical pipe organ in Latvia and was built by Henrich Andreas Concius in 1779.
 
In 1865–1866, the building underwent its first major reconstruction – the original draft tower was raised on the two upper floors to almost 55 metres high. In 1906, the church installed a clock mechanism. Several changes were also made to the sacristy behind the altar; a new one was added.

Diocese of Liepāja
The cathedral houses the cathedra (seat) of the Bishop of Liepāja, who leads one of the three dioceses of the Evangelical Lutheran Church of Latvia. The current bishop is Hanss Martins Jensons, born 11 July 1968, who was ordained in the Lutheran Church in 2003, and was consecrated and enthroned as Bishop of Liepāja on 6 August 2016.

Community use
The cathedral is also a major venue for concerts and exhibitions in the city and regularly hosts classical music concerts and art displays. Tours of the cathedral are available and the  tower offers scenic views of the city of Liepāja.

See also
 Dome Cathedral Pipe Organ

References

External links

 

Cathedrals in Latvia
Liepāja
Churches completed in 1758
18th-century Lutheran churches